Saint Martin of Arades, also called Martin of Corbie (died on 26 November 726 in Saint-Priest-sous-Aixe), was a canonized monk from Corbie Abbey, whose feast day is November 26 in both the Roman Catholic and the Eastern Orthodox Church.

He was the chaplain and confessor of the Frankish Mayor of the Palace Charles Martel. He died in Saint-Priest-sous-Aixe and was buried there. He is the patron saint of gout.

References

Christian saints
8th-century Frankish saints
726 deaths
Year of birth unknown
People from Corbie